Safflower (Carthamus tinctorius) is a highly branched, herbaceous, thistle-like annual plant in the family Asteraceae. It is commercially cultivated for vegetable oil extracted from the seeds and was used by the early Spanish colonies along the Rio Grande as a substitute for saffron. Each branch will usually have from one to five flower heads containing 15 to 20 seeds per head. Safflower is native to arid environments having seasonal rain. It grows a deep taproot which enables it to thrive in such environments.

Biology

Plant morphology
Safflower is a fast growing, erect, winter/spring-growing annual herb, that resembles a thistle. Originating from a leaf rosette emerges a branched central stem (also referred to as terminal stem), when day length and temperature increase. These lateral branches can then branch again to produce secondary and tertiary branches. The chosen variety as well as growing conditions influence the extent of branching.

The upper leaves that form the bracts are usually short, stiff and ovate, terminating in a spine. Buds are borne on the ends of branches, and each composite flower head (capitulum) contains 20–180 individual florets. Depending on variety, crop management and growing conditions, each plant can develop 3–50 or more flower heads of  diameter. Flowering commences with terminal flower heads (central stem), followed sequentially by primary, secondary and sometimes tertiary branch flower heads. Individual florets usually flower for 3–4 days. Commercial varieties are largely self-pollinated. Flowers are commonly yellow, orange and red, but white and cream coloured forms exist. The dicarpelled, epigynous ovary forms the ovule. The safflower plant then produces achenes. Each flower head commonly contains 15–50 seeds; however, the number can exceed 100. The shell content of the seeds varies between 30-60%, the oil content of the seeds varies between 20-40%.

Plant development

Safflower usually emerges 1–3 weeks after sowing and grows slower under low temperatures. Germination of safflower is epigeal. The first true leaves emerging form a rosette. This stage occurs in winter with short daylength and cold temperature, as the safflower can tolerate frosts up to  during the rosette stage.

When temperature and daylength start to increase, the central stem begins to elongate and branch, growing more rapidly. Early sowing allows more time for developing a large rosette and more extensive branching, which results in a higher yield.

Flowering is mainly influenced by daylength. The period from the end of flowering to maturity is usually 4 weeks. The total period from sowing to harvest maturity varies with variety, location, sowing time and growing conditions; for June or July sowings, it may be about 26–31 weeks.

Both wild and cultivated forms have a diploid set of 2n = 24 chromosomes. Crossings with Carthamus palaestinus, Carthamus oxyacanthus and Carthamus persicus can produce fertile offspring.

History
Safflower is one of humanity's oldest crops. It was first cultivated in Mesopotamia, with archaeological traces possibly dating as early as 2500 BC.

Chemical analysis of ancient Egyptian textiles dated to the Twelfth Dynasty (1991–1802 BC) identified dyes made from safflower, and garlands made from safflowers were found in the tomb of the pharaoh Tutankhamun. John Chadwick reports that the Greek name for safflower occurs many times in Linear B tablets, distinguished into two kinds: a white safflower (ka-na-ko re-u-ka), which was measured, and red (ka-na-ko e-ru-ta-ra) which was weighed. "The explanation is that there are two parts of the plant which can be used; the pale seeds and the red florets."

The early Spanish colonies along the Rio Grande in New Mexico used safflower as a substitute for saffron in traditional recipes. An heirloom variety originating in Corrales, New Mexico, called "Corrales Azafran", is still cultivated and used as a saffron substitute in New Mexican cuisine.

Cultivation

Climate
It tolerates , but there are also some varieties which grow under very low temperatures. Safflower is cultivated in different seasons: as a winter crop in south central India, as an early summer crop in California and as a mid-summer crop in the Northern Great Plains of the United States. Minimum length of the growing season is 120 and 200 days for summer and winter cultivars, respectively. Plant performance is highly dependent on the different planting dates in terms of temperature and day length. Winter hard varieties only form a rosette in late fall and elongates in spring. In early stages, safflower tolerates humidity but after bud stage the danger of a Botrytis blight infestation increases

Safflower is drought tolerant. The tap root makes moisture from deep soil layers available. Additionally, this tolerance can also be explained by the higher water use efficiency compared to other oil crops such as linseed and mustard. Shortly before and during maximum flowering water requirements are the highest. Beside drought tolerance, all parts of the plant are sensitive to moisture in terms of diseases. In the case of excessive water supply, it is susceptible to root rot. Therefore, many varieties are not suitable in irrigated agriculture especially on soils with danger of waterlogging.

Safflower tolerates wind and hail better than cereals. It stays erect and can retain the seeds in the head.

Soil
Safflower prefers well-drained, neutral, fertile and deep soils. It can adapt well to soil pH (pH 5-8) and tolerates salinity. Safflower can be well grown on different soil types, with water supply as its main driving factor for suitability, depending on climate and irrigation, and the resulting different water regimes of the different soil types. Therefore cultivation on shallow soils and especially on soils with danger of waterlogging is not suitable. The deep rooting promotes water and air movement and improves the soil quality for subsequent crops in a rotation.

Nutrient requirements can be compared to wheat and barley, except nitrogen amendment should be increased by 20%. Therefore, soils with an adequate nitrogen supply are favorable.

Agricultural practice

Crop rotation and sowing
Safflower is frequently grown in crop rotation with small grains, fallow and annual legumes. Close rotation with crops susceptible to Sclerotinia sclerotiorum should be avoided (e.g. sunflower, canola, mustard plant and pea). A four-year rotation is recommended to reduce disease pressure.

Seeds should be sown in spring as early as  soil temperature is exceeded, to take advantage of the full growing season. If wireworms were a problem in the field in previous seasons, a respective seed treatment is recommended. Shallow seeding promotes uniform emergence resulting in a better stand.

Where lower seeding rates promote branching, a longer flowering period and later maturity and higher rates promote thicker stands with a higher disease incidence. Sufficient moisture is necessary for germination.

Management
This should include credits based on previous crops and soil available N. For the latter, deeper positioned nutrients need to be taken into account as safflower will root deeper than small grains and therefore access nutrients unavailable to them. Safflower growing in soils low in phosphorus need to be fertilized.

A weed control program is essential when growing safflower as it is a poor competitor with weeds during the rosette stage. Cultivation on fields with heavy infestation of perennial weeds is not recommended.

Harvest
Safflower is mature when most leaves have turned brown approximately 30 days after flowering. Seeds should fall from the head when rubbed. Rain and high humidity after maturity may cause the seeds to sprout on the head.

Harvesting is usually done using a small-grain combine harvester. Moisture in seeds should not exceed 8% to allow for a safe, long-term storage. Drying can be done similar to sunflower. Temperatures must not exceed  to prevent damage to the seed and ensure quality.

Pests
 Gram pod borer/capsule borer: Helicoverpa armigera
 Safflower caterpillar: Perigaea capensis
 Safflower aphid: Uroleucon carthami
 Capsule fly/safflower bud fly: Acanthiophilus helianthi

Diseases
Alternaria spp. present one of the most prevalent diseases causing losses as high as 50% in India. In a field trial in Switzerland, Botrytis cinerea was the most prevalent disease.

Production
In 2020, global production of safflower seeds was 653,030 tonnes, led by Kazakhstan with 35% of the world total (table). Other significant producers were Russia and Mexico, with 28% of world production combined.

Uses
Traditionally, the crop was grown for its seeds, and used for coloring and flavoring foods, in medicines, and making red (carthamin) and yellow dyes, especially before cheaper aniline dyes became available.

Safflower oil
For the last fifty years or so, the plant has been cultivated mainly for the vegetable oil extracted from its seeds. Safflower seed oil is flavorless and colorless. It is used mainly in cosmetics and as a cooking oil, in salad dressing, and for the production of margarine. INCI nomenclature is Carthamus tinctorius.

There are two types of safflower that produce different kinds of oil: one high in monounsaturated fatty acid (oleic acid) and the other high in polyunsaturated fatty acid (linoleic acid). Currently the predominant edible oil market is for the former, which is lower in saturated fats than olive oil. The latter is used in painting in the place of linseed oil, particularly with white paints, as it does not have the yellow tint which linseed oil possesses.

In one review of small clinical trials, safflower oil consumption reduced blood low-density lipoprotein levels – a risk factor for cardiovascular diseases – more than those seen from butter or lard consumption.

Flowers for human consumption

Safflower flowers are occasionally used in cooking as a cheaper substitute for saffron, sometimes referred to as "bastard saffron".

The dried safflower petals are also used as a herbal tea variety.

Dye from flowers

Safflower petals contain one red and two yellow dyes. In coloring textiles, dried safflower flowers are used as a natural dye source for the orange-red pigment carthamin. Carthamin is also known, in the dye industry, as Carthamus Red or Natural Red 26. Yellow dye from safflower is known as Carthamus yellow or Natural Yellow 5. One of the yellow pigments is fugitive and will wash away in cold water. The dye is suitable for cotton, which takes up the red dye, and silk, which takes up the yellow and red color yielding orange. No mordant is required.

In Japan, dyers have long utilised a technique of producing a bright red to orange-red dye (known as carthamin) from the dried florets of safflower (Carthamus tinctorius). Darker shades are achieved by repeating the dyeing process several times, having the fabric dry, and redyed. Due to the expensive nature of the dye, safflower dye was sometimes diluted with other dyestuffs, such as turmeric and sappan.

Biodegradable oil
In Australia in 2005, CSIRO and Grains Research and Development Corporation launched the Crop Biofactories initiative to produce 93% oleic oil for use as a biodegradable oil for lubricants, hydraulic fluids, and transformer oils, and as a feedstock for biopolymers and surfactants.

See also
 Conjugated linoleic acid
 Suetsumuhana
 Tsheringma

References

External links
 
 Safflower field crops manual, University of Wisconsin, 1992
 
 

Plant dyes
Food colorings
Cooking oils
tinctorius
Medicinal plants
Vegetable oils
Plants used in traditional Chinese medicine
Plants used in Ayurveda
Plants described in 1753
Oil seeds
Abortifacients